Fulton Kuykendall (born June 10, 1953) is a former NFL football player. He is a graduate from the University of California, Los Angeles who played pro football from 1975–1985 for the Atlanta Falcons. The lanky 6-4 225 lb Kuykendall started primarily at inside linebacker for the Falcons from 1975–1983, making the Pro Football Weekly All-NFC Team in 1978.

Nicknamed "Kaptain Krazy" by his teammates, Kuykendall was known for his apparent disregard for his body, launching himself into opposing blockers and ball carriers with fervor. Kuykendall was a member of the famed 1977 Atlanta Falcons "Grits Blitz" defense, which was notable for allowing the fewest points in a season (129) during the Super Bowl era. As a result, that Falcons defense lives on in NFL lore as one of the top NFL Defenses of All-Time.

References

1953 births
Living people
American football linebackers
UCLA Bruins football players
Atlanta Falcons players
San Francisco 49ers players